Bohr-e Hajj Nowshad (also Romanized as Bohr-e Ḩājj Nowshād; also known as Bohr-e Ḩājjī Nowshād) is a village in Jam Rural District, in the Central District of Jam County, Bushehr Province, Iran. At the 2006 census, its population was 355, in 83 families.

References 

Populated places in Jam County